A forced landing is a landing by an aircraft made under factors outside the pilot's control.

Forced Landing may also refer to:

 Forced Landing (1935 film), 1935 mystery film directed by Melville Brown
 Forced Landing (1941 film), 1941 action film directed by Gordon Wiles

See also 
 Landing (disambiguation)